Samantha Akinyi Okeya (born 6 January 1995) is a Kenyan professional footballer who plays as a goalkeeper for Makolander Ladies FC and the Kenya women's national team.

Club career 
Samantha Akinyi joined the Mathare Youths Sports Association (MYSA) in 2002, where she was playing for Ruaraka zone Babadogo United Ladies.

In December 2011 she transferred to National Youth Talent Academy, which later joined the Kenya Women's League as Matuu Girls and emerge the title holders that season, later in the long run she joined Kenya Methodist University majorly known as KEMU QUEENS the 2015 League winners, she also spend some time with Spedag Fc that was so far dominating the league then. In 2018 She  joined the reigning champions Vihiga Queens in the Kenya 
 
Women Premier League. where she helped the team win the league 2018-2019,emerging the best goal keeper for the team that year

She is currently featuring for Makolander LFC .

International career 
She was the starting goalkeeper for Kenya in a 2016 Africa Women Cup of Nations qualification match against Equatorial Guinea. She represented Kenya at the 2016 Africa Women Cup of Nations, and was the goalkeeper in the match against Ghana.

See also
List of Kenya women's international footballers

References 

1995 births
Living people
Kenyan women's footballers
Women's association football goalkeepers
Kenya women's international footballers